Sun..! was the debut release from the British band Silver Sun.  At the time of release Sun was also the name of the band, though after finding out there was a German band with the same name the band were forced to change their name.

Track listing
"There Will Never be Another Me" – 2:23
"Thickshake" – 3:06
"Captain"  – 2:28
"Top Trumps" – 2:26

Silver Sun albums
1996 debut EPs